Daniel Drysdale (18 May 1901 – 15 October 1987) was a Scotland international rugby union player. He was 65th President of the Scottish Rugby Union.

Rugby union career

Amateur career
Born in Kippen, Stirlingshire Drysdale, went to George Heriots and also played for Heriot's FP, and London Scottish. He went to Edinburgh University and the University of Oxford, where he played for the teams Edinburgh University RFC and Oxford University RFC.

Provincial career
He played for Edinburgh District in the 1923 inter-city match.

International career

He was on the 1924 British Lions tour to South Africa.

He also played for the Barbarians.

Administrative career
He was president of the Scottish Rugby Union between 1951-2.

Outside of rugby union
He was a timber merchant.

References

Sources
Bath, Richard (ed.) The Scotland Rugby Miscellany (Vision Sports Publishing Ltd, 2007 )
Godwin, Terry Complete Who's Who of International Rugby (Cassell, 1987)
Massie, Allan A Portrait of Scottish Rugby (Polygon, Edinburgh)

1901 births
1987 deaths
Alumni of the University of Edinburgh
Alumni of the University of Oxford
Barbarian F.C. players
British & Irish Lions rugby union players from Scotland
Edinburgh District (rugby union) players
Edinburgh University RFC players
Heriot's RC players
Oxford University RFC players
People educated at George Heriot's School
Presidents of the Scottish Rugby Union
Rugby union players from Stirling (council area)
Scotland international rugby union players
Scottish rugby union players
Rugby union fullbacks